This is a list of precomposed Latin characters in Unicode. Unicode typefaces may be needed for these to display correctly.

Letters with diacritics

Digraphs and ligatures 

 Ǳ, ǲ, ǳ
 Ǆ, ǅ, ǆ
 ﬀ
 ﬃ
 ﬄ
 ﬁ
 ﬂ
 Ĳ, ĳ
 Ǉ, ǈ, ǉ
 Ǌ, ǋ, ǌ
 ﬆ
 ﬅ

Other characters 

A collection of precomposed Latin characters (mostly abbreviations of units of measurement) is also included in the CJK Compatibility and Enclosed CJK Letters and Months sections of Unicode, as are a set of precomposed Roman numerals; these characters are intended for use in East Asian languages and are not meant to be mixed with Latin languages. Several enclosed alphanumerics are also featured in Unicode.

Some characters in the Letterlike Symbols block can be substituted with characters in the ASCII range.

See also 
Latin script

External links 
 Unicode collation chart -- Latin letters sorted by shape

References 

Unicode